Mamoon al-Farkh (31 January 1958 – 21 May 2020) was a Syrian television, theatre and voice actor who worked on several Dubbing animation TV series and Radio voice-over and Radio drama.
He died from a heart attack on 21 May 2020.

Acting Works
 Diwan Arabs
 Migration hearts
 Family wars
 Painting the black
 Brothers soil
 Funny But yet !
 Champion of this decade
 Knights wind
 Day's  Officer
 Nights Salehia
 al-koary
 Lamps Ramadan
 Bab al-Hara  (Abu samer al-hmsane)
 Age madness
 Something resembling love

Voice roles
 Detective Conan as Shin'ichi Kudo(Seasons 1 and 2)     
 Detective Conan: The Time-Bombed Skyscraper – Ninzaburo Shiratori
 Detective Conan: Zero the Enforcer – Shinichi Kudo
 Robin Hood no Daibōken
 Dexter's Laboratory as (Major Glory from The Justice Friends) (Syrian dubbing version)
 Hunter X Hunter Satotsu , Matthew , Kiriko son , Majtani , Bodoro , MASTA
 Battle B-Daman
 One Piece - Helmeppo (episodes 2–3), Shanks, Mohji, Jango, Yosaku, Gin, Additional Voices
 Dragon Ball Shu, Turtle  
 Dragon Ball Z – Yamcha (first voice) Turtle 
 The Real Adventures of Jonny Quest as (Race Bannon)
 The New Adventures of Jonny Quest as (Race Bannon)
 Monster Rancher as (Tiger)
 The Mask: The Animated Series as (Lt. Mitch Kellaway)
 Minky Momo - Additional Voices
  Justice League as (Felix Faust and The Shade)
 What's New, Scooby-Doo?
 Dragon Booster as (Parmon Sean)
 Digimon Adventure as (Etemon, Whamon, Gennai)
 Garfield and Friends
 The Adventures of Sam & Max: Freelance Police - Additional Voices
 Ice Age: Dawn of the Dinosaurs as (Buck) (Syrian dubbing version) 
 Lost Universe as (Rail Claymore)
 Sonic the Hedgehog - Additional Voices
 Captain Tsubasa as (Taro Misaki (adult season 3 only), Hiroshi Jito (season 3 only), Hikaru Matsuyama Sakun Khongsawat, Hanji Urabe (adult season 3 only)
 Tsurikichi Sampei The Scooby-Doo Show as Mr. Carp
 Dubbing roles 
 Kamen Rider Ryuki Captain Power as (Lt. Michael 'Tank' Ellis)
 Superhuman Samurai Syber-Squad''' as (Tanker)

References

People from Damascus
Syrian male voice actors
Syrian male television actors
Syrian male stage actors
2020 deaths
1958 births
Syrian theatre people